Pon-Karidjatou Traoré (born 9 January 1986) is a Burkinabé athlete specialising in the sprinting events. She won a bronze medal in the 100 metres at the 2015 African Games.

Competition record

Personal bests
Outdoor
100 metres – 11.47 (+1.7 m/s) (Castres 2015)
200 metres – 23.69 (+0.8 m/s) (Brazzaville 2015)
Indoor
60 metres – 7.48 (Aubiére 2014)
200 metres – 25.22 (Nogent-sur-Oise 2013)

References

External links
All-Athletics profile

1986 births
Living people
Burkinabé female sprinters
Athletes (track and field) at the 2015 African Games
African Games bronze medalists for Burkina Faso
African Games medalists in athletics (track and field)
21st-century Burkinabé people